Sylvan Retreat, also known as the J. H. Pumphrey Home, is a historic raised former plantation house at 610 N. 3rd Street in Gibsland in Bienville Parish, Louisiana.  It was built in 1848 by William George Walker in another location, and was moved into Giblsland in 1884.  It was listed on the National Register of Historic Places in 1979.

It was built as a five-bay Greek Revival raised plantation house, with wood frame built of virgin cypress joined by mortises and pinned with wooden pegs.  It had a front gallery and a hip roof.   All doors and window sashes were cut on site and assembled with wooden pegs.  It included five  rooms and a  central hall, with  ceilings.  It had front and rear galleries plus a separated kitchen.

It was altered in 1884 by moving it to Gibsland, by combining four exterior fireplaces, and by reducing the front gallery to a four-column portico.

References

See also
National Register of Historic Places listings in Bienville Parish, Louisiana

Houses on the National Register of Historic Places in Louisiana
Greek Revival architecture in Louisiana
Houses completed in 1848
Bienville Parish, Louisiana